WAKO Pro World Grand Prix, was a kickboxing promotion featuring events held in between national teams since 2011 by the WAKO-Pro organization in association with national kickboxing organizations.

Rules
All the tournament fights are conducted under K-1 rules: 3 X 3 rounds with 1 minute break between them. In case of a draw, an extra round will be ordered. Wako-Pro World Grand Prix has five different weight classes: -60 kg, -66.5 kg, -75 kg, -81.5 kg and -94 kg.

Format
The national teams are composed of 5  male fighters each in five weight classes: -60 kg, -66.5 kg, -75 kg, -81.5 kg, -94 kg

WAKO Pro World Grand Prix Champions
{| class="wikitable" style="width:35%; font-size:90%"
|-
!style="background: #e3e3e3"|Year
!style="background: #e3e3e3"|Champion
!style="background: #e3e3e3"|Runner-up
|-
| 2012
|align=left| Serbia
|align=left| Russia
|-

See also
List of kickboxers

References

External links
 Wako-Pro Official website